Jesús María, also known as El Zapote, is a town in the municipality of San Martín de Hidalgo in the state of Jalisco, Mexico. It has a population of 278 inhabitants.

References

External links
Jesús María (El Zapote) at PueblosAmerica.com

Populated places in Jalisco